Daniel Rivers (born 12 June 1991) is a British sport shooter. He competed for England in the 50 metre rifle three positions and the 10 metre air rifle events at the 2014 Commonwealth Games where he won a gold and bronze medal respectively.

Sporting Career

In February 2014 Rivers won the Men's 10m air rifle at the NSRA British Open Air Gun (BOAG) Championship, becoming British Champion.

In April 2014 he was selected to represent England at the 2014 Commonwealth Games. He went on to win Bronze in the 10m air rifle, and Gold in the 50m 3-position rifle.

References

External links

1991 births
Living people
English male sport shooters
Commonwealth Games gold medallists for England
Shooters at the 2014 Commonwealth Games
Commonwealth Games bronze medallists for England
Commonwealth Games medallists in shooting
Medallists at the 2014 Commonwealth Games